Hypolycaena thecloides, the brown tit, is a small but striking butterfly found in India and South-East Asia that belongs to the lycaenids or blues family. The species was first described by Cajetan Felder and Rudolf Felder in 1860.

See also
List of butterflies of India
List of butterflies of India (Lycaenidae)

References

Butterflies of Asia
Hypolycaenini
Butterflies of Singapore